The 1986 Michigan State Spartans football team represented Michigan State University in the 1986 NCAA Division I-A football season. In their fourth season under head coach George Perles, the Spartans compiled a 6–5 overall record (4–4 against Big Ten opponents) and finished in fifth place in the Big Ten Conference.

Six Spartans were recognized by the Associated Press (AP) and/or the United Press International (UPI) on the 1984 All-Big Ten Conference football team: receivers Andre Rison (AP-1; UPI-1) and Mark Ingram Sr. (AP-2); defensive linemen John Budde (AP-2) and Mark Nichols (AP-2); linebacker Shane Bullough (AP-2; UPI-1); and punter Greg Montgomery (AP-1; UPI-1).

Schedule

Personnel

Season summary

at Arizona State

Notre Dame

Western Michigan

Iowa

at Michigan

at Illinois

Purdue
Lorenzo White rushed for 79 yards on 19 carries in part-time duty in return from injury while the Spartans' defense intercepted four passes. White ran for first half touchdowns of three and one yards, respectively.

at Minnesota

Indiana

at Northwestern

Wisconsin

References

Michigan State
Michigan State Spartans football seasons
Michigan State Spartans football